Computer games, simulations, models, and operations research programs often require a mechanism to determine statistically how likely the engagement between a weapon and a target will result in a satisfactory outcome (i.e. "kill"), known as the probability of kill. Performance auditing and statistical decisions are required when all of the variables that must be considered are not incorporated into the current model, similar to the actuarial methods used by insurance companies to deal with large numbers of customers and huge numbers of variables.  Likewise, military planners rely on such calculations to determine the quantity of weapons necessary to destroy an enemy force.

The probability of kill, or "Pk", is usually based on a uniform random number generator. This algorithm creates a number between 0 and 1 that is approximately uniformly distributed in that space. If the Pk of a weapon/target engagement is 30% (or 0.30), then every random number generated that is less than 0.3 is considered a "kill"; every number greater than 0.3 is considered a "no kill". When used many times in a simulation, the average result will be that 30% of the weapon/target engagements will be a kill and 70% will not be a kill.

This measure may also be used to express the accuracy of a weapon system, known as the probability of hit or "Phit". For example, if a weapon is expected to hit a target nine times out of ten with a representative set of ten engagements, one could say that this weapon has a Phit of 0.9. If the chance of hits is nine out of ten, but the probability of a kill with a hit is 0.5, then the Pk becomes 0.45 or 45%. This reflects the fact that even modern guided warheads may not always destroy a hit target such as an aircraft, missile or main battle tank.

Additional factors include the probability of detection (Pd), reliability of the targeting system (Rsys), and reliability of the weapon (Rw), to name a few.  For example, if a missile operates properly e.g. 90% of the time (assuming a good shot), the targeting system operates properly 85% of the time, and enemy targets are detected at 50%, we can increase the accuracy of our Pk estimation:

Pk = Phit * Pd * Rsys * Rw

For example:

Pk = 0.9 * 0.5 * 0.85 * 0.90 = 0.344

Users can also specify a probability according to a class of targets, for example, it has been stated that the SA-10 surface-to-air missile system has a Pk of 0.9 against highly maneuvering targets, whereas its Pk against non-maneuvering targets is much higher.

See also
 Dense inert metal explosive

References
A.M. Law and W.D. Kelton, Simulation Modeling and Analysis, McGraw Hill, 1991.
J. Banks (editor), Handbook of Simulation: Principles, Methodology, Advances, Applications, and Practice, John Wiley & Sons, 1998.
R. Smith and D. Stoner, "Fingers of Death: Algorithms for Combat Killing", Game Programming Gems 4, Charles River Media, 2004.

Video game gameplay
Gambling mathematics